Aberdeen Lake is a lake in northeast Mississippi on the Tennessee-Tombigbee Waterway. Close to Aberdeen, it is impounded by the Aberdeen Lock and Dam.

External links

Tennessee–Tombigbee Waterway
Reservoirs in Mississippi
Landforms of Monroe County, Mississippi